The right hand of God (Dextera Domini "right hand of the Lord" in Latin) or God's right hand may refer to the  Bible and common speech as a metaphor for the omnipotence of God and as a motif in art.

In the Bible, to be at the right side "is to be identified as being in the special place of honor". In Jesus' parable "The Sheep and the Goats", the sheep and goats are separated with the sheep on the right hand of God and the goats on the left hand.

It is also a placement next to God in Heaven, in the traditional place of honor, mentioned in the New Testament as the place of Christ at Mark 16:19, Luke 22:69, Matthew 22:44 and 26:64, Acts 2:34 and 7:55, 1 Peter 3:22 and elsewhere. These uses reflect use of the phrase in the Old Testament, for example in Psalms 63:8 and 110:1.
The implications of this anthropomorphic phrasing have been discussed at length by theologians, including Saint Thomas Aquinas.

See also

 Act of God
 Apostles' Creed
 Finger of God (disambiguation)
 Hand of God (disambiguation)
 Left Hand of God (disambiguation)
 Session of Christ
 Throne of God
 Related Biblical chapters: Psalm 63, Psalm 110, Isaiah 41, Matthew 22, Matthew 26, Mark 16, Luke 22, Acts 2, Acts 7, 1 Peter 3

References

Biblical phrases
Christian terminology
Heaven in Christianity